Doctrine is the sixth studio album by Dutch technical death metal band Pestilence, which was released on April 24, 2011. The album was recorded and mixed at Woodshed Studio in southern Germany with engineer Victor "V.Santura" Bullok. The artwork was designed by Marko Saarelainen. The album represents a second release by the reformed Pestilence, with two new members: Yuma van Eekelen and Jeroen Paul Thesseling, who was a member of the band during the Spheres era. Technically, the album is an experimentation with very low tunings, with Mameli and Uterwijk playing on 8-string guitars with standard tuning, and Thesseling playing a 7-string fretless bass tuned in F#.

Reception

The album has received mixed reviews, with much of the criticism pointed to the album's down tuned guitar sound, as well as Patrick Mameli's vocals.

Track listing

Credits

Personnel
Patrick Mameli – vocals, lead & rhythm guitar
Patrick Uterwijk – lead & rhythm guitar
Jeroen Paul Thesseling – fretless bass
Yuma Van Eekelen – drums

Production
Victor "V.Santura" Bullok - mixing, mastering
Victor Bullok - engineering, production
Marko Saarelainen - artwork, layout

References

Pestilence (band) albums
2011 albums